The Journal of Medicinal Food is a monthly peer-reviewed medical journal covering the health effects of foods and their components. It was established in 1998 and is published by Mary Ann Liebert, Inc. The editors-in-chief are Michael Zemel, PhD, (Professor Emeritus, The University of Tennessee, Chief Scientific Officer, NuSirt Biopharma) and Jeongmin Lee, PhD, (Kyung Hee University). According to the Journal Citation Reports, the journal has a 2020 impact factor of 2.786.

References

External links

Mary Ann Liebert academic journals
Publications established in 1998
Monthly journals
English-language journals
Nutrition and dietetics journals